Girl from Rio may refer to:

The Girl from Rio (1927 film), a film directed by Tom Terriss
Girl from Rio (1939 film), a film directed by Lambert Hillyer
The Girl from Rio (1969 film), a film directed by Jess Franco
Girl from Rio (2001 film), a film directed by Christopher Monger
"Girl from Rio" (song), a 2021 song by Anitta